Sarita Gurung (SAH-ree-tah GUU-rung, सरीता गुरुङ्ग) is philanthropist and social worker from Nepal who collects fund privately from Facebook social network and donates to needy people.

She is the first Social Campaigner from Nepal who utilize Facebook and Twitter for social causes. Sarita Gurung, Annapurna Gaupalika ward no-3 Paundurkot Kaski (born in Savik Dhikurpakheri VDC ward no.6) is currently living in Colorado, USA She is involved in various social activities through social networks.

She has been involved in rescue and relief work for those who have not been able to go to hospital due to financial constraints, deprived of education opportunities, due to financial constraints through social networking.

She has already constructed a house and transferred it to three poor and physically ill families. To date, she is evolved in more than three different social campaigns. Currently, She has been cooperating with the National Invention Center r run by Mahabir Pun based in Nepal.

References

3. http://baahrakhari.com/news-details/47848/2018-02-07

Nepalese social workers
Gurung people

4. https://ekantipur.com/hello-sukrabar/2017/07/28/20170728104227.html

5.Sarita Gurung | Facebook

6. Sarita Gurung | Twitter